Westchester High School can refer to:

 Westchester High School (Los Angeles)
 Westchester Academy for International Studies, formerly Westchester High School (Houston)